Niccolò De Simone, also called Nicolò Fiammingo, Lo Zet, or Lopet, (died c. 1677) was a Flemish painter, active during 1636–1654 in Naples, Italy. He was born in Liège. His style suggests he was in the circle or influenced by Jusepe de Ribera, Massimo Stanzione, Bernardo Cavallino, and Mattia Preti. Bernardo de' Dominici claims he was also painting in Spain and Portugal. A painting attributed to Simone is found in the John and Mable Ringling Museum of Art.

References

Year of birth unknown
1677 deaths
17th-century Italian painters
Italian male painters
17th-century Flemish painters
Painters from Naples
Italian Baroque painters
People from Liège Province